Adult Contemporary is a chart published by Billboard ranking the top-performing songs in the United States in the adult contemporary music (AC) market. In 1990, 18 songs topped the chart, then published under the title Hot Adult Contemporary, based on playlists submitted by radio stations.

In the issue of Billboard dated January 6, Michael Bolton reached number one with "How Am I Supposed to Live Without You", displacing the final number one of 1989, "Another Day in Paradise" by Phil Collins.  Bolton's song held the top spot for one further week before being replaced by Rod Stewart's recording of the Tom Waits song "Downtown Train".  Stewart was one of five acts to achieve two number ones during the year, as he returned to the top of the chart in April with "This Old Heart of Mine (1989 version)".  The song featured additional vocals by Ronald Isley, whose group the Isley Brothers had recorded the original version of the song in the mid-1960s.  Michael Bolton, Mariah Carey, Gloria Estefan and Wilson Phillips also took two songs to number one during the year.  Estefan and Stewart each spent a total of six weeks atop the chart, tying for the most weeks spent at number one during the year with Bette Midler, who spent six consecutive weeks in the top spot with "From a Distance", the year's longest unbroken run at number one.

In the second half of the year, Mariah Carey achieved the feat of taking her first two singles not only to the top of the Hot Adult Contemporary chart but also to number one on Billboards all-genre listing, the Hot 100, beginning a recording career which would ultimately make her the biggest-selling female performer of all time.  She would achieve six AC number ones in the first half of the 1990s, before her music began to move in a more heavily R&B and hip hop-influenced direction.  In October the Righteous Brothers reached number one with their 1965 recording of the song "Unchained Melody", which was re-released after it was prominently featured in the film Ghost.  Following the song's appearance on the film's soundtrack, the duo recorded a new version of the song, and both recordings entered the Hot 100, but it was the original rendition which gained sufficient airplay on adult contemporary radio to enter and ultimately top the AC chart.  The year's final number one was also taken from a film soundtrack.  "You Gotta Love Someone" by Elton John, which spent the last three weeks of 1990 at number one, appeared in the film Days of Thunder.

Chart history

References

See also
1990 in music
List of artists who reached number one on the U.S. Adult Contemporary chart

1990
1990 record charts
1990 in American music